Myroslav Ivanovych Bon (born 16 February 1993) is a Ukrainian former professional football goalkeeper.

Bon is a product of FC Dynamo Kyiv youth sportive system. He spent his career in the Ukrainian First League club FC Dynamo-2 Kyiv. And in July 2014 went on loan for FC Hoverla in the Ukrainian Premier League.

He retired from professional football playing, because of health issues in May 2017.

References

External links 
 Profile on FFU site 
 

1993 births
Living people
People from Khust
Ukrainian footballers
FC Dynamo Kyiv players
Association football goalkeepers
FC Dynamo-2 Kyiv players
FC Hoverla Uzhhorod players
FC Poltava players
Sportspeople from Zakarpattia Oblast